Ehd-e-Wafa is a Pakistani television series created by Inter-Services Public Relations (ISPR) and Momina Duraid under MD Productions aired on Hum TV. It revolves around four school friends with different hopes, goals and aspirations and how their lives change over time as they witness hardships, challenges and betrayal in their friendship and career. It stars Ahad Raza Mir,Osman Khalid Butt, Ahmed Ali Akbar and Wahaj Ali in lead roles.

The show was the third most searched item among the category of 'Movies & TV' on Google in Pakistan as confirmed by the Google Trends end-of-years report.
 
It also aired in Pashto language on Hum Pashto 1 by the same title.

The show was a critical and commercial success, being popular in Pakistan UK and India At 20th Lux Style Awards, it received 3 awards; Best TV Play, Best Emerging Talent for Adnan Samad Khan and Best Original Soundtrack out of 7 nominations.

Plot
The story revolves around a group of high-spirited friends who help, support, and enjoy one another's company as they overcome hardships in their lives.

Four friends, Saad, Shahzain, Shariq and Shehryar call themselves the SSG (Special 'S' Gang because all their names start with the letter 'S'). They all study at Lawrence College in Murree. Saad's family comprises his father, Brigadier (later Major General) Faraz Inam, who serves in the army, his mother and sister, Rahmeen, an aspiring artist. Shahzain belongs to a rich village family and is the closest to his grandfather, Malik Allahyar. Shariq's family consists of his sister, Ghazala and his widowed mother. Shehryar's father is a bandmaster. They often bunk college together at night and once caught by their hostel warden, Firdous Baig.

On the other hand, there is Dua and Rani. Rani is a vivacious girl, who comes from a rich village family. After three years, she is yet to pass her Intermediate exams, which she ultimately doesn't. Dua comes from Rawalpindi and is seen visiting her cousins, Aisha and Raheel in Murree. Raheel is obnoxious and is over-protective of Dua, which she immensely dislikes and tries to avoid him.

Despite receiving warnings from the headmaster of the college, the SSG still bunk college and this time, they accidentally run into Dua and her cousins. Saad immediately recognizes Dua, while Shariq and Shehryar run away from the scene. Saad tells Shahzain that he had seen Dua twice before and has a crush on her but he didn't have the courage to tell her about his feelings. Shahzain encourages Saad to go after her and get to know her name since he didn't. They follow her and eventually get to know her name.

The next day, they met Dua again after Shariq spots her with her cousins and tells the other three, who immediately rushes to her. As Shahzain and Shehryar begin to introduce themselves to Dua and tell her about Saad, Raheel pushes Saad, thinking he was harassing Dua and a physical fight follows. The police arrive and take Saad and Raheel into custody, while Shahzain and Shehryar flee, later joined by Shariq.

Dua's parents file a complaint against Saad, in the name of harassment. This causes a rift between the SSG. Shariq refuses to be involved in their tactics anymore. Saad slaps Shahzain, because he made a fuss in front of Dua. In the end, Saad, Shahzain and Shehryar were rusticated from the hostel. Since Shariq wasn't directly involved in the incident, no action was taken against him.

The four friends now go on to lead their separate lives. Shahzain doesn't show up for his exams and slowly transforms into an angry young man. Saad is confused between choosing Army or Medical as his profession but ultimately joins army after finding Dua submitting her application at the same medical college. Later they meet at a park where Dua softens up when she overhears him scolding his pet Zorro for chasing her.

Shahzain and Shehryar then visit Saad, wanting to reconcile but Saad humiliates the two and asks them to leave. Saad later departs for PMA (Pakistan Military Academy). Upon arriving at PMA, Saad meets Gulzar Hussain and develops a good friendship with him.

On the other hand, Shahzain decides to marry Dua as a revenge on Saad. 
However Dua's parents reject his proposal. Shehryar confronts Shahzain and stops him from marrying Dua, and makes him realize his mistakes. Then Shahzain, Saad, Shariq, Shehryar meet to sort out all misunderstandings. But learning that Shahzain went to Dua's house, Saad confronts Shahzain. Shahzain feels humiliated again. His marriage is fixed with Rani. He only invites Shariq and Shehryar to his wedding but when he overhears the two talking about Saad, it angers him. Shariq and Shrehyar leave realizing that Shahzain only viewed them as commodities and not friends.

In their next meeting Saad and Dua were confronted by Raheel (Dua's cousin). Dua walks off angrily and goes home. Raheel proposes to Dua for marriage but Dua refuses and tells her father to trust her that Saad is just a friend. She then tells Saad she won't contact him until they both establish their careers. Raheel's parents then invite Dua's parents and insist on their marriage but Dua's father refuses. On the way home, Dua's parents meet with an accident. Dua's father passes away and her mother becomes disabled. Her cousin blackmails her into marrying him as he finds out she is adopted. Dua agrees but then exposes him in front of his parents. Dua and her mother shift to Abbottabad to live near her medical college. Saad is shown to pass out of PMA with a sword of honour. Later he finds about Dua's father.

Shahzain is shown to be contesting in the by elections. Shariq's YouTube channel has been so well established that he is offered a job as a news anchor at a well-established channel. He accepts the job after declining at first and selects Ramsha (a former news reporter who became friends with Shariq) as producer of his show.

Shahzain wins his elections and becomes an MNA. Shariq achieves success as a news anchor. After passing out from PMA, Saad starts his army duties and visits Dua. He helps Dua in setting up her new home. They grow closer to each other and eventually meet each other's parents. Saad starts planning his wedding and bumps into Shahzain while completing a wedding-related task. They confront each other and eventually reconcile.

Meanwhile, Shehryar is appointed as an Assistant Commissioner and works with Shariq to help free one of their college friends who has been wrongly imprisoned due to a mafia gang. Shariq and Shehryar manage to successfully free him. All the four friends get together for Saad's wedding and are seen teasing Saad. On the night of the wedding, it is revealed that Dua has been appointed as an army doctor and walks down the aisle in her uniform leaving Saad in awe.

Later, Shahzain is attacked by his presumed rivals. Saad, on the other hand, is appointed in LOC Kashmir. Dua informs him that she is pregnant. Shahzain wins the elections but Shehreyar is suspicious. He confronts Shahzain on learning that he staged Choudhary Vakar(Rani's brother) for his attempted murder to win the elections. Shariq and Ramsha are going to marry each other. Shariq advises Shehryar to go to Masooma and apologize to her for his behavior. Shahzain apologizes to Rani, his grandfather and Shehryar. Rani tells him that she is pregnant.

Due to high alert on LOC all four boys stand up for their country. Shahzain went on a live show of India. Shariq covers media and tells all Pakistan about the problems at LOC. Shehryar tells people to go away from LOC. Saad is given an operation of retrieving an injured soldier from the battleground. He is eventually shot in process but manages to complete his mission. He is then taken to the hospital where he recovers. At the end all friends visit their College and advise the students on how to serve the country through various fields of opportunities.

Cast

Production

Development and background 

Ehd-e-Wafa  was co-developed by Hum TV's senior producer Momina Duraid and ISPR. Saife Hassan was chosen as a director who previously directed acclaimed serials for the channel such as Belapur Ki Dayan and Sammi. The story was written by Mustafa Afridi who previously wrote the screenplay of mega drama serial Aangan. It marked fourth collaboration of the writer and director, lastly collaborated for 2016-17's mega-hit Sang-e-Mar Mar.

Casting
Producer Momina Duraid and DG ISPR Asif Ghafoor mutually choose the cast which includes Ahad Raza Mir, Osman Khalid Butt, Ahmed Ali Akbar and Wahaj Ali as male leads. Zara Noor Abbas was selected to portray one of the lead role, Rani. Alizeh Shah known for her recent notable appearances in channel's hits Baandi, Daldal and Jo Tu Chahey was chosen to play the other female lead Duaa. Model Vaneeza Ahmed and PTV actor Faraz Inam Siddiqui were selected to play the parents of Saad. Siddiqui had also appeared in Alpha Bravo Charlie, ISPR's 1980's production that was supposed to be the original series of Ehd-e-Wafa but later denied by writer, Mustafa Afridi. Hajra Yamin and Momina Iqbal were selected to portray the parallel female leads as characters of Ramsha and Masooma respectively. Adnan Samad Khan was cast in the parallel lead role of Gulzar who made his television debut by this serial. Cake actor Syed Mohammad Ahmed was chosen to play the supporting role of Malik Allahyar while Anjum Habibi for the role of Shehryar's father. Humayun Saeed was cast as guest appearance for the last bumper episode.

Filming and production locations

The drama serial was shot in 16 cities. The college sequences were shot in Lawrence College Ghora Gali (Murree) while sequences of Saad's academy were shot in Pakistan Military Academy (Abbottabad). Other cities include Lahore, Chakwal, Rawalpindi / Islamabad, Gujrat and Bahawalpur. The shooting lasted for more than 9 months.

Series overview and reception

Television rating (TRPs)

Critical reception
Reviewing of initial episodes for Youline Magazine, the reviewer praised the chemistry of the stars and execution of the serial stating, "Each character’s individual personality comes across as fully developed from the first episode. Their hilarious first scene lets their chemistry shine through, and propels the audience into the world of the Special Services Group (SSG), one of the most otherwise secretive sections of the Army".
 The reviewer also praised the performance of Zara Noor Abbas and said that she gives the audience an exciting introduction, with her loud, clever, and bubbly disposition.

Sheeba Khan of Express Tribune praised the performances of male protagonists stating, "OKB is brilliant and has excellent comedic timing…add to that his expressions while speaking and you will can’t find one fault in his acting. Ahmed Ali, Ahad Raza Mir, and Wahaj Ali are equally great. What’s even better is their chemistry. When you watch them on screen, it doesn’t seem like they are acting. They are all very natural and their personalities really gel."

Wahaj Ali and Adnan Samad Khan received major praise from the critics due to their respective roles of Shariq and Gulzar, turned out a breakthrough project for them.

While reviewing for Daily Times, Muhammad Ali praised the writing of the serial, especially the characters' development and their journey and said it "A Treat for Youngsters".

While reviewing finale of the serial, Buraq Shabbir wrote for The News, "Ehd e Wafa stood out for tackling an unusual genre, with male protagonists, their struggle and friendship being the highlight of the drama. Besides, the women in their lives, essayed by Hajra Yamin, Alizeh Shah, Zara Noor Abbas and Momina Iqbal, played small yet substantial roles that had impact on their male counterparts. Despite a males-centric plot, it was refreshing to see most of these women having a professional life and contributing to society, unlike most other Pakistani dramas."

Controversy
A petition was filed against the drama serial in Lahore High Court. The petitioner's plea: the drama showed a negative image of politicians and media personnel. After which Justice Shahid Waheed declared the petition inadmissible and decided to reject it. He remarked that the petitioners should first apply to PEMRA and if there is no hearing, they can approach the court.

 Soundtracks 

 
The title song of the serial "Dil Ka Dil Se Hua Hai Ehd-E-Wafa" was performed by Ali Zafar, Sahir Ali Bagga, Asim Azhar and Aima Baig. The lines of the song are frequently used during the course of the show. Later another soundtrack "Sab Ehd-E-Wafa Ke Naam Kiya" performed by Rahat Fateh Ali Khan was released on 7 February 2020.

BroadcastEhd-e-Wafa originally premiered on 22 September 2019. Ehd-e-Wafa airs a weekly episode on every Sunday succeeding Anaa'', starting from its premiere date, with time slot of 8:00 pm. It was aired on Hum Europe in UK, on Hum TV USA in USA and Hum TV Mena on UAE, with same timings and premiered date. All International broadcasting aired the series in accordance with their standard timings.

It was simultaneously broadcast on state channel PTV Home with the same timings.
The show was dubbed in Pashto and is currently broadcast by Hum Pashto 1 with the same title.

Awards and nominations

See also 

 Inter-Services Public Relations media productions

References

External links

2019 Pakistani television series debuts
Inter-Services Public Relations media productions
Inter-Services Public Relations
Urdu-language television shows
Hum TV original programming
Inter-Services Public Relations dramas
Pakistani military television series
India–Pakistan relations in popular culture